Kassowal is a town of Chichawatni Tehsil, Sahiwal District, Punjab, Pakistan. The town is located at 30°29'0" North, 72°32'0" East. Kassowal is approximately 220 km from the major city Lahore and Kassowal is approximately 110 km from the second major city Multan. The population is 10,000. A small village on the Karachi-Lahore railway line during.It was after the Sahi clan of Sanpaal's  Kharal Jatt Rajput Minhas who were the inhabitants of this area. The town is in the densely populated region between the Sutlej and Ravi rivers. The principal crops are wheat, cotton, tobacco, legumes, potato and oilseeds. Cotton goods and lacquered woodwork are manufactured.

Police Station Kassowal
Police Station Kassowal was established in 1915. Sub Inspector Mian Zaman Rasheed Wattu is currently working as a SHO & Nazir Ahmad Vehniwal Working as Mohrer, Mr. Adnan & Bilal Working as a Police Station Assistants in PS Kassowal.

Economy
Agriculture is important to the local economy, particularly the growing of cotton, grain, potato, wheat and rice exported all over Pakistan and around the world. As well as its cattle and sheep, the Division is also famous for Water Buffalo milk.
Industry

Sahiwal division
Industry of Sahiwal division is mainly an Agro-based Industries and has approximately 1682 industrial units. The main industries include Beverage & Food processing units (Mitchell's Fruit Farms Limited, Montgomery Biscuits, Beakers Land & Sweets Factory etc.), Rice Mills, Sugar Mills (Ittefaq Sugar Mills Limited, Baba Farid Sugar Mills Limited etc.), Drugs & Pharmaceuticals, Tobacco (Lackson Tobacco etc.), Cotton Ginning & Pressing, Flour Mills, Fertilizer companies (Fauji Fertilizer Company Limited etc.), Vegetable Ghee & Cooking Oil (Habib Oil Mill etc.), Textile Weaving/Spinning, Soap & Detergent, Paper & Paper Board, Poultry Feed, Seed Processing and leather products.

Broadcast Media
There are various radio and cable networks broadcasting in the town, such as Radio Awaz Fm 105. Sun Rise FM 96 and cable networks like Star Cable Network. The main companies providing dial-up internet facilities are BrainNet and CyberNet. World Call Wireless has also started its operation in Kassowal. World Call provides wireless telephones at low call rates and a wireless internet facility which is much faster than the dial-up service providers in the town Recently, Wateen Telecom has also in Kassowal. Wateen offers landline telephone, cellular phone, HAQ television, high-speed internet and WiMax

Educational institutions
Kassowal houses several educational institutes of quality. Government Higher Secondary School is one of big institute in the town It has 10 acres of land which includes the Schools building, a separate library building, inside two Hall named Jinnah Hall and Iqbal Hall and vast green playgrounds Government Girls High School, and other Private schools and Colleges

Schools
Government Higher Secondary School 4/14-L, Government Primary School Ada Kassowal, Government Girls High School 4/14-L, Government Primary School 118/12-L, Government Primary School 4/14-L, Government middle school 103/12.l, Government girls high school 103/12.l Government High school 102/12.l, Government Girls High School 102/12.l, Vocational Training Institute 4/14-L 
and other Private school and Colleges. The Educator School, Care House School System, DareArqam School System, EFA School System The private sector is playing a major role in primary education: renowned schools in this regard The Educators.

Colleges
 Sir Syed Group of Colleges Kassowal
 Quaid E Azam College
 The Care House Boys and Girls High School System
 The Educator
 Ideal Public School & College
 Qasim Public School and College
 Tameer E Millat High School
 The Scholar College
 Noor Kaddah High School
 Ideal Polytechnical Institute
 Muhammadan Girls Science College
 Efa School system (Project Punjab group of colleges)
 Kassowal Public School
 Vocational Training Institute 4/14-L

Banks 
 United Bank Limited UBL
 Muslim Commercial Bank MCB
 Habib Bank Limited HBL
 Zarai Taraqiati Bank Limited ZTBL
 Punjab Provincial Cooperative Bank Limited PPCBL
 National bank of pakistan NBP
 Bank Al-Habib Limited
 Allied Bank Limited
 Kashaf Microfinance Bank Limited
 Akhuwat Loan Center Kassowal
 Meezan Bank Limited

Hospitals 
 Ganj Shakar Hospital 
 Essa Memorial Hospital 
 Al-manzoor Surgical Hospital 
 Rabia Surgical Hospital
 Al-Siraj Clinical Hospital
 Dr.Muhammad Aslam Arain Hospital
 Rural Health Center 4/14.L - Kassowal
 Basic Health Unit 39/14.L- Kassowal

References

External links
 http://www.kassowal.com/History.html

Populated places in Sahiwal District